is a former Japanese football player.

Playing career
Kitauchi was born in Kochi Prefecture on April 25, 1974. After graduating from Hannan University, he joined the Japan Football League club Sagan Tosu in 1997. He played as a midfielder during the first season and the club was promoted to the new J2 League in 1999. He also became a regular player. However his opportunity to play decreased in 2002 and he retired at the end of the 2002 season.

Club statistics

References

External links

1974 births
Living people
Hannan University alumni
Association football people from Kōchi Prefecture
Japanese footballers
J2 League players
Japan Football League (1992–1998) players
Sagan Tosu players
Association football midfielders